Frank Ivan Joseph Nobilo  (born on 14 May 1960) is a professional golfer from New Zealand.

Nobilo had a successful playing career, winning 14 pro tournaments around the world. He was at his peak during the mid-1990s when he also produced strong finishes in all four major championships.

Since his 2003 retirement, Nobilo has worked as a television announcer for golf events.

Personal life
Nobilo was born in Auckland, of Italian and Croatian descent, and is the great grandson of an Italian pirate. At birth, his right leg was shorter than his left, causing him ongoing back problems. He was educated at St Peter's College in Auckland where he was persuaded to play golf by schoolmates (Chris Treen and Mark Lewis). Nobilo preferred to play Rugby league for Glenora over Rugby Union for St Peter's, which was "a bone of contention" with the school. "I got a bit of grief because I preferred league over rugby then and I was a bit more of a rebel. I used to catch the train to and from school and it took about 30–40 minutes. My mum said it drove her crazy because I missed it often and my parents were living in Glen Eden and I would end up in Henderson and they'd have to come and collect me".

Nobilo and his wife, Selena, married in 1998. He has a daughter, Bianca Nobilo, from a previous marriage. Nobilo works as an ambassador for The House of Nobilo, one of New Zealand's leading wineries and founded by one of his relatives Nikola Nobilo. Frank Nobilo was appointed a Companion of the New Zealand Order of Merit, for services to golf, in the 1998 Queen's Birthday Honours.

Career
In 1978, Nobilo won the New Zealand Amateur at 18, the second-youngest winner of this title. He turned professional in November 1979. His first professional win came in 1982 at the New South Wales PGA Championship on the PGA Tour of Australasia.

Nobilo joined the European Tour in 1985 as a full-time player, having played in selected events in 1982 and 1983. He recorded his first win on the Tour in the 1988 PLM Open (not to be confused with the KLM Open). Nobilo subsequently won four other European Tour events and finished inside the top 50 on the Order of Merit every season from 1988 to 1996, with a best of 14th place in 1993.

After strong performances in all the majors, including a 4th-place finish in the Masters Tournament and a tie for 8th in the PGA Championship, Nobilo left Europe at the end of 1996 and joined the United States-based PGA Tour for the following season. He won the Greater Greensboro Chrysler Classic during his rookie season, which proved to be his only win on that tour. He has featured in the top 50 of the Official World Golf Rankings.

One week after his marriage to Selena in 1998, Nobilo was struck above the left eye by an errant tee shot at the Lake Nona Golf & Country Club in Central Florida. The injury required 30 stitches, and affected his play afterwards.

Nobilo played for the International Team in each of the first three Presidents Cups (1994, 1996, 1998). He contributed significantly to the international appeal of the event when in 1998 and paired with fellow kiwi Greg Turner he holed a 70-foot putt on the final green to defeat the American pairing. On 2 October 2008, International Presidents Cup team captain Greg Norman announced that Frank Nobilo would serve as his assistant captain for the 2009 Presidents Cup 6–11 Oct. 2009 at Harding Park Golf Course in San Francisco.

On 9 October 2007, it was reported that Nobilo had announced he would be coming out of retirement, and attempt to gain a card for the U.S. PGA Tour through qualifying school. However, in a statement issued on the Golf Channel's website, Nobilo denied the report: "I have not, nor did I have any intention of entering this years PGA Tour Qualifying school."

Television work
Upon retiring from tournament golf in 2003, Nobilo joined the Golf Channel for studio coverage. He has been a key member of the Live From team at the major championships. From 2012-2014, he occasionally filled in for Peter Jacobsen on NBC's golf coverage (NBC and Golf Channel are corporate siblings).

In 2015, Nobilo joined CBS's golf coverage, replacing Peter Oosterhuis. Like Oosterhuis did, he worked only the cable coverage of about half of CBS's events, while working on the network coverage of the other half, including the Masters and PGA Championship. He remained on Live From on Golf Channel but will no longer be allowed to fill in on NBC. Nobilo made his CBS debut at the 2015 Phoenix Open.

He was also a commentator in Rory McIlroy PGA Tour Video Game, released in 2015.

Amateur wins
1978 New Zealand Amateur
1979 New Zealand Under-25 Stroke Play Championship

Professional wins (14)

PGA Tour wins (1)

PGA Tour playoff record (1–0)

European Tour wins (5)

Asian Tour wins (1)

PGA Tour of Australasia wins (2)

Asia Golf Circuit wins (1)

Other wins (4)
1987 New Zealand PGA Championship
1995 Sarazen World Open
1996 Subaru Sarazen World Open
1997 Mexican Open

Results in major championships

CUT = missed the half-way cut
"T" = tied

Summary

Most consecutive cuts made – 9 (1986 Open Championship – 1994 PGA)
Longest streak of top-10s – 1 (five times)

Results in The Players Championship

CUT = missed the halfway cut
"T" indicates a tie for a place

Results in World Golf Championships

Team appearances
Amateur
Eisenhower Trophy (representing New Zealand): 1978
Nomura Cup (representing New Zealand): 1979

Professional
World Cup (representing New Zealand): 1982, 1987, 1988, 1990, 1991, 1992, 1993, 1994, 1995, 1998, 1999, 2000
Alfred Dunhill Cup (representing New Zealand): 1985, 1986, 1987, 1989, 1990, 1992, 1994, 1995, 1996, 1997, 1998
Presidents Cup (International team): 1994, 1996, 1998 (winners)
Alfred Dunhill Challenge (representing Australasia): 1995
UBS Warburg Cup (representing the Rest of the World): 2001

See also
2000 PGA Tour Qualifying School graduates
List of alumni of St Peter's College, Auckland

References

External links

New Zealand male golfers
PGA Tour of Australasia golfers
European Tour golfers
PGA Tour golfers
Golf writers and broadcasters
Companions of the New Zealand Order of Merit
People educated at St Peter's College, Auckland
New Zealand people of Croatian descent
New Zealand people of Italian descent
Golfers from Auckland
1960 births
Living people